The Grange School is a co-educational secondary school and sixth form located in the Somerford area of Christchurch in the English county of Dorset. The school mainly admits pupils from the Somerford, Mudeford & Burton areas.

History 
The school opened in 1955 as Somerford Secondary Modern School and became The Grange in 1969 when it went comprehensive, at the time Christchuch being in Hampshire until 1974 when it became part of Dorset, the school becoming part of Dorset LEA.

The school converted to academy status on 1 February 2015 and is now part of the Twynham Learning multi-academy trust. In the summer of 2021 The Grange School underwent a significant restructure formalising its relationship with Twynham School. The Twynham Learning offices relocated to The Grange School campus along with the successful BDP SCITT and the professional development hub, Two Rivers Institute. In December 2021 The Grange School was judged to be "good" in all areas by Ofsted.

Notable former pupils
Miles Gibson, novelist

References

External links
 The Grange School official website

Schools in Christchurch, Dorset
Educational institutions established in 1955
1955 establishments in England
Secondary schools in Bournemouth, Christchurch and Poole
Academies in Bournemouth, Christchurch and Poole